Saigon South International School (SSIS) is an international school in Ho Chi Minh City offering an American standards-based curriculum for grades EC-12. It offers both the IB diploma program and AP coursework, and is fully accredited by the Western Association of Schools and Colleges. The school is also a member of East Asian Council of Overseas Schools, National Association of Independent Schools, the Southeast Asia Student Activities Conference (SEASAC), and Mekong River International Schools Association (MRISA). SSIS was recently designated an Apple Distinguished School.

It is located in Phu My Hung, District 7, Ho Chi Minh City.

Profile
Saigon South International School was founded in 1997 by the Phu My Hung Corporation to accommodate an increasing need for American education for both local residents and expatriate families. Located in the Phu My Hung Urban Area, SSIS is two and a half miles south of the current city center - District 1, Ho Chi Minh City, Vietnam. SSIS is owned by the Phu My Hung Corporation but operates as a non-profit entity within the company. A three-member school board governs the school in consultation with the Phu My Hung Corporation.

SSIS enrolls over 1000 students from over 39 countries. The professionally certified and experienced teachers are career educators. Most come from North America, Australia and the United Kingdom and as specialists in their subject area, over 80% hold advanced educational degrees. More than 65% have more than 12 years of teaching experience. SSIS offers an American standards-based curriculum, augmented by the rigorous Advanced Placement Program (AP) and the International Baccalaureate Diploma Programme (IBDP), in high school. SSIS students also have one of the highest average IBDP points in Ho Chi Minh City, and average roughly 5 points higher than the worldwide average.

Facilities
Saigon South International School has a large,  campus with three main buildings that contain around over 1,000 students in Early Childhood 3 (EC3) – Grade 12. The newer purpose-built high school building was completed in January 2011 and includes general classrooms, purpose-built science labs, a library, a gymnasium, changing/locker rooms, and a kiosk.

The other two school buildings contain two libraries for elementary and middle, an auditorium, a double-sized gymnasium for two basketball courts, a swimming pool and a shared cafeteria. The outside playing fields have three soccer fields and separate play areas for the early childhood program and elementary students.

Extracurricular activities
SSIS offers extracurricular activities, referred to as ASAs (After School Activities) within the school.

Student Council
Service Council
National Honor Society
Athletics: basketball, volleyball, soccer, badminton, tennis, and swimming, where the students compete against other schools in the Mekong River International Schools Association (MRISA Sports Exchange), Saigon International Schools Athletics Competition, and South East Asia Student Activities Conference (SEASAC).
 Visual Arts, with projects for fundraising events, and an exhibition at the end of the school year, and taking part in the MRISA Arts Exchange for middle and high school students
 Music, with two performances per school year for Elementary, and taking part in the MRISA Arts Exchange for middle school and high school students

 Animal Rights
 Model United Nations
 Dragon Tales
 DECA@SSIS
 ISSC (International School Science Competition)
 Mr. William's Chemistry Horror
 VEX Robotics 
 Girls Who Code
 Bliss4Youth
 Grass Roots
 Changmin Hwang Appreciation Club
 Ben Tre Construction
 Love is Love
Dragon Broadcast Club
Fundraising initiatives
Operation Smile Club
HeartSaysFreeMove Club
Global Issues Group
Minecraft
Many other activities such as ballet, badminton, softball, soccer, basketball, art club, swim club, computer club, cooking, crafts, math games, board games, digital animation, newspaper, origami, sewing, chess, piano, martial arts, and writing, are offered by the staff and community members.

References

Educational institutions established in 1997
International schools in Vietnam
Schools in Vietnam
High schools in Ho Chi Minh City
MRISA Schools
1997 establishments in Pakistan